Carolyn Marie Becker (born November 8, 1958) is an American former competitive volleyball player and Olympic silver medalist.  Becker also played NCAA women's volleyball with the USC Trojans.

References

 ; retrieved 2010-12-11.

1958 births
Living people
American women's volleyball players
Volleyball players at the 1984 Summer Olympics
Olympic silver medalists for the United States in volleyball
USC Trojans women's volleyball players
People from Lynwood, California
Medalists at the 1984 Summer Olympics
Pan American Games medalists in volleyball
Pan American Games silver medalists for the United States
Medalists at the 1983 Pan American Games